"Secret Agent Man" is a rock song performed by Australian band The Superjesus. The song was released in February 2001 as the second single from the band's second studio album, Jet Age (2000). The song peaked at number 43 on the Australian ARIA Singles Chart.

Track listing
CD Single (8573867482)
 "Secret Agent Man"  (Radio edit) 	
 "Last Thing You're Looking For"	
 "Letter to The Peace Corp"	
 "Secret Agent Man"  (Album version)

Charts

References

2001 singles
2000 songs
Songs written by Sarah McLeod (musician)
Song recordings produced by Ed Buller
Warner Records singles
The Superjesus songs